Turkey and Ukraine have a long chronology of historical, geographic, and cultural contact. Diplomatic relations between both countries were established in early 1990s when Turkey became one of the first states in the world to announce officially about recognition of sovereign Ukraine. Turkey has an embassy in Kyiv and a consulate general in Odesa. Ukraine has an embassy in Ankara and a consulate general in Istanbul. Turkey is a full member of NATO and Ukraine is a candidate. Also both countries are BLACKSEAFOR and BSEC members.

In late January 2010 Ukrainian President Viktor Yanukovych and Turkish Prime Minister Recep Tayyip Erdoğan agreed to form a free trade zone between the two countries during 2011. But bilateral free trade talks were put on hold in 2013.

Following the end of 2015, Turkey and Ukraine experienced closer relations as a result of both countries increasingly strained relationship with Russia. On 20 August 2016 Turkish President Recep Tayyip Erdoğan told his Ukrainian counterpart Petro Poroshenko that Turkey would not recognize the 2014 Russian annexation of Crimea; calling it "Crimea's occupation". On 9 January 2017 Turkey's Foreign Minister Mevlüt Çavuşoğlu stated "We support the territorial integrity of Ukraine and Georgia. We do not recognize the annexation of the lands of Ukraine".

As of April 2022, number of Ukrainian refugees in Turkey has reached up to 85,000.

History 
On February 3, 2020, Turkish President Recep Tayyip Erdoğan visited Ukraine and met with Ukrainian President Volodymyr Zelenskyy. They signed an agreement on military-financial cooperation. It provided for the Turkish side to allocate about $36 million for the needs of the Armed Forces of Ukraine for the purchase of Turkish military and dual-use goods.

Abduction of Turkish dissidents 
There has been a rise in number of Turkish dissidents fleeing to Ukraine, following the violent crackdown launched by Turkish leader Erdoğan following the failed 2016 coup. In 2018, the Turkish regime pressured then-President of Ukraine, Petro Poroshenko, to handle dissidents. Subsequently, Ukraine imprisoned and deported two Turkish journalists, and a blogger, revoking their visas.

According to Radio Free Europe in February 2020, the Ukrainian government was found complicit in letting the Turkish intelligence abduct Turkish dissidents, mostly those who linked with the Gülen movement; Kyiv had already deported a number of Gulenists back to Turkey in 2021.

Russian invasion of Ukraine 

On 3 February 2022, Turkish President Recep Tayyip Erdogan volunteered to organize a Ukraine-Russia conference during a visit to Ukraine, as EU leaders increased up outreach to the Kremlin to calm worries of a Russian invasion. As the crisis escalated, Ukraine ambassador to Turkey asked Turkey to close the nation's Black Sea-Mediterranean straits to Russian warships. On 25 February, on the other hand, the Republic of Turkey abstained from voting on Russia’s suspension from the Council of Europe as it calls for open dialogue between the parties under any circumstances. Turkish Foreign Minister Mevlut Cavusoglu also reiterated Turkey's "readiness to host negotiations that could take place between the Russian Federation and Ukraine," accordingly.
On 27 February 2022, Cavusoglu publicly stated that Turkey had shifted its terminology to refer to Russia's assault on Ukraine as a "war," and committed to enforce elements of the 1936 Montreux Convention's international pact which allows Turkey to prohibit Russian warships from entering the Bosporus and Dardanelles and thus hinder Russian vessels' transit from the Mediterranean to the Black Sea. On 28 February, President Tayyip Erdogan public confirmed that the straits would be closed to prevent an escalation of the war, while also pledging to maintain relations with both Ukraine and Russia.

Turkey has provided Ukraine with Bayraktar drones since 2019, which played a significant role in deterring Russian advances in the early stages of the 2022 Russian-Ukrainian War, but has not imposed sanctions on Russia for the conflict.

On 3 May 2022, Ukrainian President Volodymyr Zelenskyy accused Turkey of having "double standards" by welcoming Russian tourists while attempting to act as an intermediary between Russia and Ukraine in order to end the war.

Ukraine's ambassador to Turkey said that Turkey is one of the countries that is buying grain that Russia stole from Ukraine.

On 17 July 2022, Russian, Ukrainian and Turkish military delegations met with United Nations officials in Istanbul to start talks on the resumption of exports of Ukrainian grain from the Black Sea port of Odesa. On 22 July 2022, Russian and Ukrainian officials have signed the deal to allow grain exports from Ukrainian Black Sea ports. Under the agreement, a coalition of Turkish, Ukrainian and UN staff will monitor the loading of grain into vessels in Ukrainian ports, to allay Russian fears of weapons smuggling  before navigating a preplanned route through the Black Sea, which remains heavily mined by Ukrainian and Russian forces. On 29 October 2022, Russia said it was suspending its participation in the grain deal, in response to what it called a major Ukrainian drone attack on its Black Sea fleet. US President Joe Biden called the move "purely outrageous".

Response to the 2023 Turkey-Syria Earthquakes

On February 6, 2023, two powerful earthquakes with magnitudes of 7.8 and 7.5 struck southern Turkey and northern Syria, causing widespread destruction and loss of life. According to the Turkish disaster agency, the earthquakes have killed at least 3,432 people in Turkey and over 1,602 people in Syria.

On the same day, Ukrainian Foreign Minister Dmytro Kuleba announced that Ukraine might send several dozen emergency workers to Turkey to assist in the relief efforts. Additionally, the Ukrainian Foreign Ministry received 27 requests from citizens who were unable to get in touch with their relatives in Turkey.

Later that day, Ukrainian foreign ministry spokesman Oleg Nikolenko reported that they had located six Ukrainian citizens who were safe and in satisfactory condition, but their houses were destroyed. They were currently living with Turkish relatives.

On February 7, 2023, President Volodymyr Zelensky issued a decree ordering the sending of humanitarian aid to Turkey to help the country overcome the consequences of the earthquake.

Embassies 
The Embassy of Turkey is located in Kyiv, Ukraine. The Embassy of Ukraine is located in Ankara, Turkey.

Diplomacy

Republic of Turkey
Kyiv (Embassy)
Odesa (Consulate-General)

Republic of Ukraine
Ankara (Embassy)
Istanbul (Consulate-General)
Antalya (Consulate)

See also
Foreign relations of Turkey
Foreign relations of Ukraine 
Ukraine–NATO relations
Turks in Ukraine
Crimean Tatars

References

External links
Turkish embassy in Kyiv
Ukrainian embassy in Ankara
Turkish Ministry of Foreign Affairs about relations with Ukraine

 
Ukraine
Bilateral relations of Ukraine